Remember Me Ballin' is the CD single by Indo G featuring Gangsta Boo. The song is sampled from Curtis Mayfield's Give Me Your Love featured on the hit soundtrack, Super Fly. Like Indo's last single, the song had a video released with it .

Track listing
 "Throw Them Thangs" (Unclean) / "Remember Me Ballin'" (Unclean)
 "Throw Them Thangs" (Clean) / "Remember Me Ballin'" (Clean)

1998 songs
Gangsta rap songs